Pattens are protective overshoes that were worn in Europe from the Middle Ages until the early 20th century. Pattens were worn outdoors over a normal shoe, had a wooden or later wood and metal sole, and were held in place by leather or cloth bands. Pattens functioned to elevate the foot above the mud and dirt (including human effluent and animal dung) of the street, in a period when road and urban paving was minimal.

Etymology

The word patten probably derives from the Old French patte meaning hoof or paw.

Women continued to wear pattens in muddy conditions until the 19th or even early 20th century.  In appearance, they may resemble contemporary clogs or sandals, but though historical usage was apparently not always consistent, the term now is used only to describe protective overshoes worn over another pair of shoes.

Medieval period
Pattens were worn during the Middle Ages outdoors, and in public places, over (outside of) the thin soled shoes of that era. Pattens were worn by both men and women during the Middle Ages, and are especially seen in art from the 15th century; a time when poulaines—shoes with very long, pointed toes—were particularly in fashion. 

Medieval pattens were known in English by the terms: 'patyns', 'clogges', and 'galoches', but the original shades of meaning and distinction between these terms is now unclear. Medieval and Early Modern overshoes are now all usually referred to as 'pattens' for convenience.

Types

There were three main types of pattens. One of these types had a wooden 'platform' sole raised from the ground, either with wooden wedges or iron stands. A second variant had a flat wooden sole, often hinged. The third type had a flat sole made from stacked layers of leather. Some later European varieties of these pattens had a laminated sole; light wooden inner sections with leather above and below. 

In earlier varieties of pattens, dating from the 12th century on, the stilt or wedge variety were more common. From the late 14th century, the flat variety became increasingly common. Leather pattens became fashionable in the 14th and 15th centuries, and in London, appear to have begun to be worn as shoes over hose in the 15th century, spreading to a much wider section of the public. Most London patten soles were constructed of alder, willow or poplar woods.

In 1390, the Diocese of York forbade clergy from wearing pattens and clogs in both church and processions, considering them to be indecorous—"contra honestatem ecclesiae". Conversely, the famous rabbi Shlomo ibn Aderet (the Rashba, c. 1233–c. 1310) of Aragon was asked if it was permissible to wear patines on Shabbat, to which he replied that it was the custom of "all the wise in the land" to wear them, and was certainly permitted. 

Since shoes of the period had thin soles, pattens were commonly used mainly because of unpaved roads, as well as the fact that indoor stone floors were very cold in winter. Furthermore, refuse in cities — animal, especially horse, feces and human effluent (from chamber pots) — was usually thrown directly into the street (often with minimal advance warning). Making full foot contact with such an unpleasant surface was, understandably, highly undesirable. Thus, pattens tended to only make contact with the ground through two or three strips of wood and raised the wearer up considerably, sometimes by four inches (ten centimetres) or more, in contrast to clogs, which usually have a low, flat-bottomed sole integral to the shoe.

Early Modern period

A later pattern of patten which seems to date from the 17th century, and then became the most common, had a flat metal ring which made contact with the ground, attached to a metal plate nailed into the wooden sole via connecting metal, often creating a platform of several inches (more than 7 centimetres). By this time men's shoes had thicker soles and the wealthier males (the gentry or gentlemen) commonly wore high riding boots, thus pattens seem only to have been worn by women and working-class men in outdoor occupations. Since dress hems extended down to the feet for most of this period, it was necessary to raise the hem above the ground to keep the dress clean even in well-swept and paved streets.   The motto of the London Worshipful Company of Pattenmakers, the former representative guild for this trade, was and remains: Recipiunt Fœminæ Sustentacula Nobis, Latin for Women Receive Support From Us.  The 19th-century invention of cheap rubber galoshes gradually displaced the patten, as did the widespread use of urban paving, especially elevated, paved pathways only for pedestrians - the now ubiquitous pavements (sidewalk in American English) - or hard road surfaces.

Etiquette and practicality
Wearing of pattens inside church was discouraged, if not outright forbidden: perhaps because of the noise they made, the oft-commented "clink" being the consensus term for the sound; Jane Austen wrote of the "ceaseless clink of pattens" referring to life in Bath. To talk excessively and too loudly was coined to be as if one: "had your "tongue run (or go) on pattens", used by Shakespeare and others. In houses, pattens were taken off with hats (for men) and overcoats upon entering, not doing so being considered rude and inconsiderate by bringing dirt inside – literally a faux pas or wrong step.  The aunt of the Brontë Sisters, Miss Branwell, seems to have been considered notably eccentric for wearing her pattens indoors:

Pattens were not always easy to walk in, and despite their practical intention, literary evidence suggests that they could appear, at least to males, as a further aspect of feminine frailty and dependency. Samuel Pepys recorded in his diary for 24 January 1660:

From the Middle Period Poems of John Clare (1820s):

("hitops" are high boots)

From Thomas Hardy's The Woodlanders of 1887, though set earlier in the century:

Other uses of the term
The word could also be used as a term for a wooden soled shoe, that is a chopine or clog, as opposed to an overshoe, until at least the nineteenth century.  The word was also used for the traditional wooden outdoor shoes of Japan and other Asian countries. What are in effect snowshoes for mud, as used by wildfowlers, boatmen, and Coast Guards may also be called pattens, or "mud-pattens".  These are shaped boards attached to the sole of a shoe, which extend sideways well beyond the shape of the foot, and therefore are a different sort of footwear from the patten discussed here. "Horse-pattens" were used on horses, especially for ploughing muddy fields.  The word was also used for ice-skates, as it is in French (patiner, to skate).

The Worshipful Company of Pattenmakers
In London, the Worshipful Company of Pattenmakers remains the Livery Company, formerly guild of the Patten-makers, or Patteners, and their adopted church remains St Margaret Pattens.  The first record of the guild dates to 1379, and there was still a pattenmaker listed in a London Trade Directory in the 1920s.  A notice, probably 18th century, in the Guild Church still requests ladies to remove their pattens on entering; other English churches have similar signs, and in one case, a board with pegs for ladies to hang them on.

See also
 Clog
 Geta (footwear)

Notes

References
Arnold, Janet:  Queen Elizabeth's Wardrobe Unlock'd, W S Maney and Son Ltd, Leeds 1988. 
Ashelford, Jane. The Visual History of Costume: The Sixteenth Century. 1983 edition, 1994 reprint.
Boucher, François: 20,000 Years of Fashion, Harry Abrams, 1966.
Kohler, Carl: A History of Costume, Dover Publications reprint, 1963, 
Laver, James: The Concise History of Costume and Fashion, Abrams, 1979
Payne, Blanche: History of Costume from the Ancient Egyptians to the Twentieth Century, Harper & Row, 1965. No ISBN for this edition; ASIN B0006BMNFS
Grew, F & De Neergaard, M: Shoes and Pattens', Museum of London, The Boydell Press, Woodbridge 2001. 
Goubitz, O. et al. Stepping Through Time: Archaeological Footwear from Prehistoric Times Until 1800'', Stichting Promotie Archeologie 2001. Reprinted 2007 in Paperback

External links

Pattens and overshoes in 15th-century art
Excavated German patten
Scroll down to Finding a Patten of John Gough for good photos of a circle-type patten, and good text on Early Modern pattens
Several examples of 18th-century women's pattens
Pattens from Manchester Art Gallery
Website of The Worshipful Company of Pattenmakers, history page

 (making hinged pattens)

Clogs (shoes)
Footwear accessories
History of clothing (Western fashion)
Medieval European costume